Anele Lungisa (born 4 March 1992) is a South African rugby union player for the  in the Currie Cup. His regular position is lock or flanker.

Lungisa was named in the  side for the 2022 Currie Cup Premier Division.

References

South African rugby union players
Living people
Rugby union locks
Rugby union flankers
Eastern Province Elephants players
Pumas (Currie Cup) players
1992 births